Haji Mullah Nasir Akhund is an Afghan Taliban politician who is currently serving as Deputy Minister of Finance of the Islamic Emirate of Afghanistan since 23 November 2021.

References

Living people
Taliban government ministers of Afghanistan
Year of birth missing (living people)